Skawinka is a  river in the Lesser Poland Voivodeship of Poland, right tributary of the Vistula River with a length of  and a drainage basin of .

The main tributaries counting from the mouth:  (right); Mogiłka (left); Włosianka, Łutówka, Głogoczówka,  (right).

The most important places along Skawinka: Skawinki, Lanckorona, Kalwaria Zebrzydowska, Leńcze, Wola Radziszowska, Radziszów, Rzozów, Skawina.

The river lends its name to the village Skawinki located at its source and to the town of Skawina, which is the last town before its mouth. Sometimes it is called "Cedron" by the residents of the neighboring villages, especially around Kalwaria Zebrzydowska. In the late middle ages it used to be a political border between Silesia and Lesser Poland, and also between the Bohemian Crown and the Crown of Poland.

See also
 List of rivers of Poland

References

Rivers of Poland
Rivers of Lesser Poland Voivodeship